There are more than 60 dams in the Columbia River watershed in the United States and Canada. Tributaries of the Columbia River and their dammed tributaries, as well as the main stem itself, each have their own list below. The dams are listed in the order as they are found from source to terminus. Many of the dams in the Columbia River watershed were not created for the specific purposes of water storage or flood protection. Instead, the primary purpose of many of these dams is to produce hydroelectricity. As can be seen in the lists, these dams provide many tens of gigawatts of power.

Major dam construction began in the early 20th century and picked up the pace after the Columbia River Treaty in the 1960s, by the mid 1980s all the big dams were finished. Including just the dams listed below, there are 60 dams in the watershed, with 14 on the Columbia, 20 on the Snake, seven on the Kootenay, seven on the Pend Oreille / Clark, two on the Flathead, eight on the Yakima, and two on the Owyhee. Averaging a major dam every , the rivers in the Columbia watershed combine to generate over 36,000 megawatts of power, with the majority coming on the main stem. Grand Coulee Dam is the largest producer of hydroelectric power in the United States, generating 6,809 megawatts, over one-sixth of all power in the basin.

In addition to providing ample power for the people of the Pacific Northwest, the reservoirs created by the dams have created numerous recreational opportunities, including fishing, boating, and windsurfing. Furthermore, by creating a constant flow and consistent depth along the river channel, the series of locks and dams have allowed for Lewiston, Idaho, to become the furthest inland seaport on the west coast of the United States. Despite the numerous benefits to humans that the dams have provided, a number of environmental consequences have manifested as a result of the dams, including a negative impact on salmonid populations of the basin.

The organization of the following lists begins with the Columbia River dams and is followed by dams on its tributaries (in order of length) and their respective watersheds. Additionally, the table of contents below is indented to indicate tributary status of each river.

Main stem Columbia River dams
Dams are listed in order from headwater (Columbia Lake, BC) to mouth (Pacific Ocean, OR/WA).

Snake River dams
Dams are listed in order from headwater (Two Oceans Plateau, WY) to mouth Columbia River, WA.

Salmon River dams

Little Salmon River dams
Dams are listed in order from headwater (north West Mountain, ID) to mouth (Salmon River, ID)

Owyhee River dams
Dams are listed in order from headwater (near Double Mountain, NV) to mouth (Snake River, OR/ID)

South Fork Owyhee River dams
Dams are listed in order from headwater (north Tuscarora Mountains, NV) to mouth (Owyhee River, ID)

Malheur River dams
Dams are listed in order from headwater (Logan Valley, OR) to mouth (Snake River, OR/ID)

Grande Ronde River dams

Wallowa River dams
Dams are listed in order from headwater (near Pete's Point, Eagle Cap Wilderness, OR) to mouth (Grande Ronde River, OR)

Powder River dams
Dams are listed in order from headwater (confluence of McCully Fork and Cracker Creek, OR) to mouth (Snake River, OR/ID)

Blackfoot River dams
Dams are listed in order from headwater (confluence of Diamond and Lanes Creeks, ID) to mouth (Snake River, ID)

Henrys Fork dams
Dams are listed in order from headwater (Henrys Lake, ID) to mouth (Snake River, ID)

Fall River dams
Dams are listed in order from headwater (Pitchstone Plateau, WY) to mouth (Henrys Fork, ID)

Portneuf River dams
Dams are listed in order from headwater (southeast of Higham Peak, ID) to mouth (Snake River, ID)

Salmon Falls Creek dams
Dams are listed in order from headwater (Jarbidge Mountains, NV) to mouth (Snake River, ID)

Boise River dams
Dams are listed in order from headwater (confluence of North and Middle Forks Boise River, ID) to mouth (Snake River, ID/OR)

South Fork Boise River dams
Dams are listed in order from headwater (confluence of Ross Fork and Johnson Creek, ID) to mouth (Boise River, ID)

Goose Creek dams
Dams are listed in order from headwater (near Monument Peak, ID) to mouth (Snake River, ID)

Weiser River dams
Dams are listed in order from headwater (near Brush Mountain, ID) to mouth (Snake River, ID/OR)

Burnt River dams
Dams are listed in order from headwater (confluence of North and South Fork Burnt Rivers, OR) to mouth (Snake River, OR/ID)

Willow Creek dams
Dams are listed in order from headwater (Blackfoot Mountains, ID) to mouth (Snake River, ID)

Payette River dams
Dams are listed in order from headwater (confluence of South and Middle Forks Payette River, ID) to mouth (Snake River, ID/OR)

North Fork Payette River dams
Dams are listed in order from headwater (Squaw Meadows, ID) to mouth (Payette River, ID)

South Fork Payette River dams
Dams are listed in order from headwater (near Vernon Lake, ID) to mouth (Payette River, ID)

Clearwater River dams

North Fork Clearwater River dams
Dams are listed in order from headwater (near Illinois Peak, ID/MT) to mouth (Clearwater River, ID)

Malad River dams

Big Wood River dams
Dams are listed in order from headwater (near Galena Summit, ID) to mouth (Malad River, ID)

Camas Creek
Dams are listed in order from headwater (near Packer Butte, ID) to mouth (Big Wood River, ID)

Little Wood River dams
Dams are listed in order from headwater (Standhope Peak, ID) to mouth (Malad River, ID)

Kootenay River dams
Dams are listed in order from headwater (near Castle Mountain, Beaverfoot Range, BC) to mouth (Columbia River, BC).

Bull River dams
Dams are listed in order from headwater (Canadian Rockies) to mouth (Kootenay River, BC).

Elk River dams
Dams are listed in order from headwater (Upper Elk Lake) to mouth (Kootenay River, BC).

Duncan River dams
Dams are listed in order from headwater (near Mount Dawson) to mouth (Kootenay River, BC).

Mark Creek dams
Dams are listed in order from headwater (Purcell Mountains) to mouth (Kootenay River, BC).

Pend Oreille River / Clark Fork River dams
Dams are listed in order from headwater of Clark Fork River (Silver Bow Creek, MT) to mouth of Pend Oreille River (Columbia River, BC).

Flathead River dams
Dams are listed in order from headwater (Confluence of North Fork and Middle Fork Flathead River) to mouth (Clark Fork River).

Deschutes River dams
Dams are listed in order from headwater (Little Lava Lake, OR) to mouth (Columbia River, WA/OR).

Yakima River dams
Dams are listed in order from headwater (Keechelus Lake, WA) to mouth (Columbia River, WA).

Cle Elum River dams
Dams are listed in order from headwaters (near Mount Daniel, WA) to mouth (Yakima River, WA).

Kachess River dams
Dams are listed in order from headwaters (Three Queens, WA) to mouth (Yakima River, WA).

Naches River dams

Bumping River dams
Dams are listed in order from headwaters (near Crag Mountain, WA) to mouth (Naches River, WA).

Tieton River dams
Dams are listed in order from headwaters (Goat Rocks, WA) to mouth (Naches River, WA).

Willamette River dams
Dams are listed in order from headwaters (Confluence of Middle Fork Willamette River and Coast Fork Willamette River, OR/WA) to mouth (Columbia River, OR)

Santiam River dams
Dams are listed in order from headwaters (confluence of North Santiam and South Santiam rivers) to mouth (Willamette River, OR).

Middle Fork Willamette River dams
Dams are listed in order from headwater (Timpanogas Lake, OR) to mouth (Willamette River, OR).

McKenzie River dams
Dams are listed in order from headwater (Clear Lake, OR) to mouth (Willamette River, OR).

Coast Fork Willamette River dams
Dams are listed in order from headwater (Confluence of Big River and Garoutte Creek, OR) to mouth (Willamette River).

Spokane River dams
Dams are listed in order from headwater (Lake Coeur d'Alene, ID) to mouth (Columbia River, WA).

Cowlitz River dams
Dams are listed in order from headwater (confluence of the Ohanapecosh River and the Clear Fork of the Cowlitz River, WA) to mouth (Columbia River, WA)

Lewis River dams
Dams are listed in order from headwater (Adams Glacier, Mount Adams, WA) to mouth (Columbia River, WA)

Spillimacheen River dams
Dams are listed in order from headwater (Canadian Rockies) to mouth (Columbia River, BC).

Wenatchee River dams
Dams are listed in order from headwater (Lake Wenatchee, WA) to mouth (Columbia River, WA)

Chelan River dams
Dams are listed in order from headwater (Lake Chelan, WA) to mouth (Columbia River, WA)

See also

List of lakes in Washington (state)
List of tallest dams in the world
Dams in the Colorado River system
List of reservoirs and dams in the United States
Columbia River Treaty (US–Canadian treaty regulating hydroelectric development)

Notes

References

External links

Columbia River
Hydroelectric power stations in British Columbia
Hydroelectric power plants in Oregon

Dams in the Columbia River watershed
Dams in the Columbia River watershed
Dams in the Columbia River watershed
Dams in the Columbia River watershed
Dams
Columbia dams